Pasi Wedman (born March 21, 1975, in Kuusamo) is a Finnish sport shooter. He competed at the 2000 Summer Olympics in the men's 10 metre running target event, in which he placed fourth.

References

1975 births
Living people
Running target shooters
Finnish male sport shooters
Shooters at the 2000 Summer Olympics
Olympic shooters of Finland
People from Kuusamo
Sportspeople from North Ostrobothnia